Sidus may refer to:
 Sidus (Corinthia), a village of ancient Corinthia
 Sidus (Ionia), a town of ancient Ionia 
 SidusHQ, South Korean talent management agency
 Sidus Pictures, South Korean film production and distribution company

See also
 Sidera (disambiguation) ; "sidera" is the plural for the Latin "sidus"